Delsym is an American brand of cough medicine owned by Reckitt, and manufactured at Unither Manufacturing in Rochester, NY. It is different from most brands of cough medicine in that the active ingredient is "time released". The time release feature allows the drug to suppress the cough reflex for a longer period of time. The active ingredient per teaspoon (5 mL) is dextromethorphan polistirex, equivalent to dextromethorphan HBr 30 mg.

Method of action
The active ingredient, dextromethorphan (metabolized to dextrorphan), is surrounded by an edible plastic called polistirex. When the Delsym arrives in the stomach, an initial amount of dextromethorphan is immediately released into the bloodstream while the rest is surrounded by a plastic that is slowly dissolved by stomach acid. After the polistirex is dissolved sufficiently, more dextromethorphan is released.

Recreational use

Intentionally consuming more than the recommended dosage of Delsym may result in euphoria, lack of coordination, hallucinations, apathy, feelings of dissociation, and disorientation. This is due to dextromethorphan as well as its pharmacologically-active metabolite dextrorphan, both dissociative drugs that work as NMDA receptor antagonists the same way nitrous oxide (N2O), ketamine, and phencyclidine (PCP) do. Because of the abuse potential, many pharmacies and large retail chains have begun taking precautions such as restricting sales to those under age 18 and limiting the number of sales of dextromethorphan-containing products per customer.

References

External links

Antitussives
Products introduced in 1986
Reckitt brands